The initialism UCC may stand for:

Law
 Uniform civil code of India, referring to proposed Civil code in the legal system of India, which would apply equally to all irrespective of their religion
 Uniform Commercial Code, a 1952 uniform act to harmonize state contract law for the sale of goods in the respective states of the United States
 Uniform Construction Code, a set of laws regulating construction in the United States
 Union Customs Code, of the European Union Customs Union, gradually implemented from May 1, 2016
 Universal Copyright Convention, adopted at Geneva in 1952, is one of the two principal international conventions protecting copyright

Science and technology
 Unified Communications Certificate
 Unique Country Code
 Unitary Coupled Cluster, a kind of coupled cluster in computational chemistry
 Unlock CPU Core, a technology in ASRock motherboards
 upper camel case, a writing style for compound words used primarily in encoding where each word is capitalized as in  UpperCamelCase
 Urothelial cell carcinoma
 user-created content (user-generated content), a Web 2.0 component
 UCC, a codon for the amino acid serine

Churches
 United Christian Church, a small evangelical body of Christians with roots in the pietistic movement of Martin Boehm and Philip William Otterbein
 United Church of Canada, the largest Protestant Christian denomination in Canada
 United Church of Christ, a mainline Protestant Christian denomination primarily in the Reformed tradition
 Ukrainian Catholic Church, the largest Eastern Rite Catholic sui juris particular church in full communion with the Holy See

Educational institutions
 Umpqua Community College, a community college in Roseburg, Oregon, USA
 Ullswater Community College, a comprehensive school in Penrith, Cumbria, United Kingdom
 Urban Construction College, a university college of Shenyang Jianzhu University in Shenyang, Liaoning, China
 Union County College, a two-year college throughout Union County, New Jersey
 Catholic University of Córdoba, a private Jesuit university in Córdoba, Argentina
  (Spanish for 'Central University of the Caribbean'), a private university in Bayamón, Puerto Rico
 University of Caloocan City, a public university in Caloocan, Philippines
 University of Cape Coast, a university located in Cape Coast, Central Region, Ghana
 University College Cardiff, previous name of Cardiff University in Cardiff, Wales
 University of the Commonwealth Caribbean, a university in Kingston, Jamaica, previously known as University College of the Caribbean
 University College of the Cariboo, a university college in Kamloops, British Columbia, Canada renamed Thompson Rivers University in 2004
 University College Chichester, the previous name of University of Chichester in Chichester, England
 University College Cork, a constituent university of the National University of Ireland in Cork, Ireland
 Upper Canada College, an independent school located in Toronto, Ontario, Canada
 Uppingham Community College, a secondary school in Uppingham, Rutland, England
 Ursuline College (Chatham), a college in Chatham-Kent, Ontario, Canada

Other organizations
 Ukrainian Canadian Congress, umbrella organization of numerous associations of the Ukrainian community in Canada
 UCC GAA, a football and hurling club associated with University College Cork, Ireland
 Union Carbide Corporation, a chemical and polymer company, responsible for the Bhopal disaster in 1984
 UCC Ueshima Coffee Co., a Japanese coffee and beverage manufacturing company
 Uganda Communications Commission, the regulator of the communications industry in Uganda
 Uniform Code Council, former name of GS1 US
 University College Cork R.F.C., a rugby union club
 University Computing Company, the former name of Uccel
 University Cottage Club, an eating club of Princeton University

Other
 Undepreciated capital cost, an account containing the original value of different classes of assets minus the accrued Capital Cost Allowance for Canadian tax purposes
 Unified combatant command, a United States joint military command
 Urban Cookie Collective, a British techno and house band
 Urgent care clinic, category of walk-in clinic focused on the delivery of ambulatory care in a dedicated medical facility outside of a traditional emergency room.
 Yucca Airstrip (IATA: UCC, ICAO: KUCC)